Yegorlyksky District is an administrative and municipal district (raion), one of the forty-three in Rostov Oblast, Russia. It is located in the south of the oblast. Its administrative center is the rural locality (a stanitsa) of Yegorlykskaya. Population: 35,733 (2010 Census);  The population of Yegorlykskaya accounts for 49.4% of the district's total population.

Notable residents 

Saak Karapetyan (1960–2018), Russian deputy attorney general of Armenian descent, born in the rural settlement of Balko-Gruzskoe
Fedor Tokarev (1871–1968), weapons designer, deputy of the Supreme Soviet 1937–1950, born in the stanitsa of Yegorlykskaya

References

Notes

Sources

Districts of Rostov Oblast